U Sports men's soccer is the highest level of play at the university level under the auspices of U Sports, Canada's governing body for university sports. As of the 2018 season, 48 teams from Canadian universities are divided into four conferences, drawing from the four regional associations of U Sports: Canada West Universities Athletic Association, Ontario University Athletics, Réseau du sport étudiant du Québec, and Atlantic University Sport. After interconference playoffs have been played, eight teams compete for the Sam Davidson Memorial Trophy, awarded to the U Sports Men's Soccer Championship team. It is currently held by the Thompson Rivers WolfPack who defeated the UBC Thunderbirds on November 13, 2022.

Season structure

Regular season
The regular season is eight to nine weeks long, depending on the conference. Teams play between 12 and 16 regular season games, depending on conference or division, with teams typically playing a home and home series with every other team in their conference or division. All regular season games are in-conference. Following the conclusion of the regular season, the Joe Johnson Memorial Trophy is awarded annually to the Player of the Year in U Sports men's soccer.

Playoffs
After the regular season, single elimination playoff games are held between the top teams in each conference to determine conference champions. In the Canada West and Quebec conferences, the top four teams qualify for the playoffs, with the fourth and first seeded teams playing one match and the third and second seeded teams playing another. The two winning teams then play for the conference championship. Because there are more teams in the Atlantic conference, the top six teams qualify, with the top two teams receiving a first-round bye. The sixth and third seeded teams play one match and the fifth and fourth seeded teams play another. The winning teams then go on to play the top two seeded teams, with the lowest remaining seed playing the first seeded team and the highest remaining seed playing the second seeded team. The winners of these two semi-final matches then play for the Atlantic conference championship.

The Ontario playoff system operates much like the Atlantic one, except it functions for both the West and East divisions. The top six teams from each division (twelve total) qualify for the playoffs, with the top two seeds of each division receiving byes. The champions of each division then play for the OUA conference championship. Because the OUA has 12 teams competing, it necessitates a longer post-season schedule. Consequently, the first round of the playoffs in the OUA occurs during the same week that each of the other three conferences are playing their last regular season games. The four conference champions automatically qualify for the U Sports men's soccer championship.

Men's Soccer Championship

The U Sports Men's Soccer Championship, first established in 1972, features eight teams in single elimination matches to determine a national champion. The championship hosts 11 games over four days at a predetermined host venue. The host team is automatically qualified for the tournament, as is each of the conference champions. Another berth is awarded to the second-place finisher in the Ontario conference and the two remaining spots are awarded to the second-place finisher in each of the remaining conferences. If an OUA team is hosting, three teams from the OUA qualify.

Teams

Atlantic University Sport

Canada West Universities Athletic Association

Ontario University Athletics

Réseau du sport étudiant du Québec

Soccer careers of alumni 

U Sports was previously not geared towards producing professional soccer players, though some U Sports players have turned pro. U Sports players are not eligible for the MLS SuperDraft, but are able to be selected in the CPL or USL draft. Top players in high schools and sports academies may opt not to play in U Sports so that they can turn pro directly. Despite this, some U Sports alumni in the pro ranks include Haidar Al-Shaiban (Western), Nana Attakora (York), Gabe Gala (Toronto), Srdjan Djekanović (UBC).

Since 2019, U Sports men's soccer players have been eligible for the CPL–U Sports Draft, a draft conducted by the Canadian Premier League. This has allowed Canadian University Soccer players to have a direct route to a professional league after post secondary school. The creation of the USPORTS-CPL Draft has given a pathway to dozens of players since its inception. Not only do professional clubs now focus on drafting these players but they will be invited to training camps during the University’s Offseason allowing for greater development. For those not drafted or signed they can return to school; if eligibility remains.

References

External links
 

University and college soccer in Canada
Soccer leagues in Canada